Mohamed Fadel Brahami (born June 27, 1978) in Bondy (Paris), France), is an Algerian football player who currently plays at Bulgarian club PFC Minyor Pernik. His favourite position is as a defensive midfielder but he can also play as a right-back and on the right side of the midfield.

International career
Brahami received his first call-up to the Algerian National Team when Georges Leekens called him up for a friendly against Angola on March 29, 2003. He played the full 90 minutes in the right-back position with the game ending 1-1.

National team statistics

References

External links
 

1978 births
Living people
Algerian footballers
Algeria international footballers
Algerian expatriate footballers
French sportspeople of Algerian descent
AEP Paphos FC players
Le Havre AC players
R.A.A. Louviéroise players
R.A.E.C. Mons players
Expatriate footballers in Cyprus
Expatriate footballers in Belgium
Algerian expatriate sportspeople in Belgium
Belgian Pro League players
Ligue 1 players
Ligue 2 players
Cypriot First Division players
Algerian expatriate sportspeople in Cyprus
FCM Aubervilliers players
Association football midfielders
Sportspeople from Bondy
Footballers from Seine-Saint-Denis